Zoe Petre (23 August 1940–1 September 2017) was a Romanian classical scholar and politician.

From 1986 Petre was Dean of the Faculty of History at the University of Bucharest, and from 1996 to 2000 she was a presidential advisor to the Romanian president Emil Constantinescu. 

She was awarded the Legion of Honour by the French state with the rank of Commander in 1999 and the Order of the Dannebrog by the Danish state with rank of Grand Cross in 2000.

Select Bibliography
1993. Civilizaţia greacă şi originile democraţiei I. Bucharest.
1994. Societatea greacă arhaică şi clasică. Bucharest.
2000. Vîrsta de bronz. Bucharest.
2000. Cetatea greacă, între real şi imaginar. Bucharest.

References

1940 births
2017 deaths
Women classical scholars
Recipients of the Legion of Honour
Romanian classical scholars
University of Bucharest alumni
Academic staff of the University of Bucharest
Grand Crosses of the Order of the Dannebrog